The Dutch Eerste Divisie in the 1966–67 season was contested by 20 teams. Since there were only fifteen teams in the previous season, several new teams entered the competition. FC Volendam won the championship.

New entrants
Promoted from the 1965–66 Tweede Divisie:
 FC Den Bosch
 DFC
 SC Drente (Promoted as Zwartemeer)
 De Graafschap
 Racing Club Heemstede
 SVV
 Vitesse Arnhem
 FC Zaanstreek
Relegated from the 1965–66 Eredivisie:
 Heracles

League standings

See also
 1966–67 Eredivisie
 1966–67 Tweede Divisie

References
 Netherlands - List of final tables (RSSSF)

Eerste Divisie seasons
2
Neth